Faisal Sultan  is a Pakistani physician who has served as the Chief Executive Officer of the Shaukat Khanum Memorial Cancer Hospital and Research Centre from 2003 to 2020. He was later appointed as the Special Assistant to the Prime Minister on National Health Services in August 2020.

Education 
Sultan studied at the Cadet College Hasan Abdal in Pakistan. He graduated from the King Edward Medical College in Pakistan and subsequently trained in the United States in internal medicine at the University of Connecticut (1989-92) and in infectious disease at the Washington University School of Medicine (1992-1995). He is certified by the American Board of Internal Medicine in internal medicine and infectious diseases. He became a Fellow of the Royal College of Physicians Edinburgh, UK in 2007 and a Fellow of the College of Physicians and Surgeons in Pakistan (Infectious Diseases) in 2010.

Career 

Sultan was appointed as a Consultant Physician in Infectious Disease at Shaukat Khanum Memorial Cancer Hospital and Research Centre in 1995 and served as the Medical Director of the Hospital in 2000 to 2002 and as the Chief Executive Officer from 2003 until August 2020. After onset of the coronavirus pandemic, Sultan was appointed as the Prime Minister’s Focal Person on COVID-19 in Pakistan and later as the Special Assistant to the Prime Minister on National Health Services in Pakistan in August 2020. 

He has been a trainer and examiner in Infectious Diseases for College of Physicians and Surgeons of Pakistan as well as member of technical advisory committees for the National AIDS Control Program, Pakistan Medical Research Council, Pakistan Science Foundation, University of Health Science of Pakistan and the School of Biological Sciences, University of the Punjab, Lahore, the Punjab Healthcare Commission and on Human Papillomavirus Vaccine Advisory Committee [HVAC], WHO and has authored multiple scientific publications. He was part of the Core Group for setting, Pakistan’s National Accreditation Standards for Hospitals, Ministry of Health

He has served on the Prime Minister’s task force on health and as chairman of board of governors, Medical Teaching Institute Khyber Teaching Hospital Peshawar as well as on the steering committee for Punjab Health Strategic Plan.

References

Living people
21st-century Pakistani politicians
Year of birth missing (living people)
Cadet College Hasan Abdal alumni
Pakistani infectious disease physicians
Pakistan Tehreek-e-Insaf politicians
King Edward Medical University alumni
University of Connecticut alumni
Washington University School of Medicine alumni
Pakistani government officials